Rhopalocarpus mollis is a tree in the family Sphaerosepalaceae. It is endemic to Madagascar. The specific epithet  is from the Latin meaning "soft", referring to the very soft indumentum on the leaves' underside.

Description
It is not known to have any flowers. The fleshy fruits are coloured green when fresh.

Distribution and habitat
Rhopalocarpus mollis is known only from four locations in the northern regions of Sofia and Analanjirofo.

Threats
Rhopalocarpus mollis is threatened by shifting patterns of agriculture. Because the species is used as timber, subsistence harvesting is also a threat.

References

mollis
Endemic flora of Madagascar
Trees of Madagascar
Plants described in 2006